Arado Flugzeugwerke was a German aircraft manufacturer, originally established as the Warnemünde factory of the Flugzeugbau Friedrichshafen firm, that produced land-based military aircraft and seaplanes during the First and Second World Wars.

History
With its parent company, it ceased operations following the First World War, when restrictions on German aviation were created by the Treaty of Versailles. In 1921, the factory was purchased by Heinrich Lübbe, who is said to have assisted Anthony Fokker in the creation of the pioneering Stangensteuerung synchronization gear system during 1914-15, and re-commenced aircraft construction for export, opening a subsidiary, Ikarus, in Yugoslavia. Walter Rethel, previously of Kondor and Fokker, was appointed head designer. In 1925, the company joined the Arado Handelsgesellschaft ("Arado trading firm") that was founded by the industrialist Hugo Stinnes Jr. for covering up illegal trade with military equipment. When the Nazi government came to power in Germany in 1933, Lübbe took control of the company. Just prior to that, Walter Blume, formerly of Albatros, replaced Rethel.

Arado achieved early prominence as a supplier to the Luftwaffe with the Arado Ar 66, which became one of the standard Luftwaffe trainers right into World War II. The firm also produced some of the Luftwaffe's first fighter aircraft, the Ar 65 and Ar 68. In 1936, the RLM (Reichsluftfahrtministerium – "Reich Aviation Ministry") insisted that, as a show of loyalty, Lübbe should join the Nazi party. When he refused, he was arrested and forced to sell the company to the state. It was renamed to the more specific (and accurate) Arado Flugzeugwerke GmbH, and was placed under the direction of Erich Serno, and Felix Wagenführ, himself a former IdFlieg officer in World War I.

When Germany invaded Poland, instigating World War II, two more Arado products rose to prominence, the 
Ar 96, which became the Luftwaffe's most used trainer, and the Ar 196 a reconnaissance seaplane that became standard equipment on all larger German warships. Unfortunately for Arado, most of their other designs were passed over in favour of stronger products from their competitors, such as Germany's only heavy bomber fielded during the war, the Heinkel He 177, for which Arado was the primary subcontractor. Perhaps Arado's most celebrated aircraft of the war was the Ar 234, the first jet-powered bomber. Too late to have any real effect on the outcome of the conflict, it was nevertheless a sign of things to come.

Until their liberation in April 1945 by the Soviet army, 1,012 slave laborers from Freiberg, a sub-camp of the Flossenbürg concentration camp, worked at the Arado factory, beginning with the first trainload of 249 prisoners arriving in August 1944. The prisoners were mostly Polish Jewish women and girls sent to Freiberg from Auschwitz.

Arado also licence-built various versions of, and components for the Focke-Wulf Fw 190.

In 1945, the company was liquidated and broken up.

The Ar 96 continued to be produced in Czechoslovakia by Zlin for many years after the war as the C.2B.

Aircraft
Arado aircraft include: 
Arado L 1, sportsplane
Arado L II, sportsplane
Arado S I, civil trainer
Arado S III, civil trainer
Arado SC I, civil trainer
Arado SC II, civil trainer
Arado SD I, prototype fighter
Arado SD II, prototype fighter
Arado SD III, prototype fighter
Arado SSD I, prototype fighter seaplane
Arado V I – airliner
Arado W 2 – civil trainer seaplane
Arado Ar 64, fighter (biplane)
Arado Ar 65, fighter/trainer (biplane – re-engined Ar 64)
Arado Ar 66, trainer + night fighter
Arado Ar 67, fighter (biplane) (prototype)
Arado Ar 68, fighter (biplane)
Arado Ar 69, trainer (biplane) (prototypes), 1933
Arado Ar 76, fighter (biplane) + trainer
Arado Ar 77, trainer + light fighter 
Arado Ar 79, trainer + civilian aircraft
Arado Ar 80, fighter (prototype)
Arado Ar 81, two-seat biplane (prototype)(1936)
Arado Ar 95, coastal patrol + attack (biplane seaplane)
Arado Ar 96, trainer
Arado Ar 195, carrier based torpedo bomber
Arado Ar 196, ship-borne reconnaissance + coastal patrol (seaplane)
Arado Ar 197, naval fighter (biplane - derived from Ar 68)
Arado Ar 198, reconnaissance
Arado Ar 199, seaplane trainer
Arado Ar 231, fold-wing U-boat reconnaissance aircraft (prototype)
Arado Ar 232, transport
Arado Ar 233, seaplane(concept), 1940
Arado Ar 234 Blitz ('Lightning'), bomber (jet-engined)
Arado Ar 240, heavy fighter + attack
 Arado Ar 296, trainer, similar to Ar 96 but all wood construction
Arado Ar 340, medium bomber
Arado Ar 396, trainer
Arado Ar 432, transport, similar to Ar 232 but mixed wood and metal construction
Arado Ar 440, heavy fighter + attack
Arado Ar 532, cancelled transport

Major internal World War II projects under the RLM:
Arado E.240
Arado E.300
Arado E.310
Arado E.340
Arado E.370
Arado E.371
Arado E.375
Arado E.377
Arado E.377ª
Arado E.380
Arado E.381/I
Arado E.381/II
Arado E.381/III
Arado E.385
Arado E.390
Arado E.395
Arado E.396
Arado E.401
Arado E.430
Arado E.432
Arado E.433
Arado E.440
Arado E.441
Arado E.470
Arado E.480
Arado E.490
Arado E.500
Arado E.530
Arado E.532
Arado E.555
Arado E.560
Arado E.561
Arado E.580
Arado E.581.4
Arado E.581.5
Arado E.583
Arado E.625
Arado E.632
Arado E.651
Arado E.654
Arado Ar Projekt II jet fighter

See also
List of RLM aircraft designations

References

External links

 .
 

Defunct aircraft manufacturers of Germany
Companies involved in the Holocaust